Tomostethus is a genus of sawflies. It includes the species Tomostethus multicinctus, Tomostethus nigritus, and others. It was first described in 1886.

References

Sawfly genera
Tenthredinidae